May Allison (June 14, 1890 – March 27, 1989) was an American actress whose greatest success was achieved in the early part of the 20th century in silent films, although she also appeared on stage.

Life and career
Allison was born in Rising Fawn, Georgia, the youngest of five children born to Dr. John Simon "Sam" Allison and Nannie Virginia (née Wise) Allison. She made her Broadway stage debut in the 1914 production of Apartment 12-K before settling in Hollywood, California in the early days of motion pictures. Allison's screen debut was as an ingenue in the 1915 star-making Theda Bara vehicle A Fool There Was. 

When Allison was cast that same year opposite actor Harold Lockwood in the Allan Dwan directed romantic film David Harum, audiences quickly became enamored of the onscreen duo. The pair starred in approximately twenty-five highly successful features together during the World War I era and became one of the first celebrated on-screen romantic duos. 

Allison and Lockwood's highly popular film romances ended, however, when in 1918 Lockwood died at the age of 31 after contracting Spanish influenza, a deadly epidemic that swept the world from 1918 through 1919 killing 50 to 100  million people globally. Allison's career then faltered markedly without her popular leading male co-star. She continued to act in films throughout the 1920s, although she never received the same amount of public acclaim as when she starred opposite Harold Lockwood. Her last film before retiring was 1927's The Telephone Girl, opposite Madge Bellamy and Warner Baxter.

Allison was secretly married to Col. William Stephenson in Santa Ana, California, in December 1919, but the marriage was annulled in February 1920. On Thanksgiving day in 1920, Allison married writer and actor Robert Ellis. Allison filed for divorce from Ellis in December 1923, citing cruelty as the reason. Her filing explained the couple had married on November 25, 1920 in Greenwich, Connecticut and were separated about November 5, 1923.  Allison then married Photoplay magazine editor James R. Quirk, a union that lasted until his death in 1932.

Allison's last marriage, to Cleveland industrialist Carl Norton Osborne, lasted over 40 years until his death in 1982. In her later years, she spent much of her time at her vacation home in Tucker's Town, Bermuda, and was a patron of the Cleveland Orchestra.

Death
Allison died of respiratory failure in Bratenahl, Ohio, in 1989 at the age of 98, and was buried at the Gates Mills South Cemetery in Gates Mills, Ohio.

Selected filmography

A Fool There Was (1915) - The Wife's Sister
David Harum (1915) - Mary Blake
The Governor's Lady (1915) - Katherine Strickland
The Secretary of Frivolous Affairs (1915) - Loulie
The Great Question (1915, Short) - Flora Donner
The House of a Thousand Scandals (1915) - Martha Hobbs
The End of the Road (1915) - Grace Wilson
The Buzzard's Shadow (1915) - Alice Corbett
The Other Side of the Door (1916) - Ellie Fenwick
The Secret Wire (1916, Short) - Vera Strong
The Gamble (1916, Short) - Jean Hastings
The Man in the Sombrero (1916, Short) - Alice Van Zandt
The Broken Cross (1916, Short) - Helen Brandon
Lillo of the Sulu Seas (1916, Short) - Lillo
Life's Blind Alley (1916) - Helen Keating
The Come-Back (1916) - Patta Heberton
The Masked Rider (1916) - Jill Jamison
The River of Romance (1916) - Rosalind Chalmers
Mister 44 (1916) - Sadie Hicks
Big Tremaine (1916) - Isobel Malvern
Pidgin Island (1916) - Diana Wynne
 The Promise (1917)  - Ethel Manton
The Hidden Children (1917) - Lois de Contrecoeur
Social Hypocrites (1918) - Leonore Fielding
The Winning of Beatrice (1918) - Beatrice Buckley
A Successful Adventure (1918) - Virginia Houston
The Return of Mary (1918) - Mary
The Testing of Mildred Vane (1918) - Mildred Vane
Her Inspiration (1918) - Kate Kendall
In for Thirty Days (1919) - Helen Corning
Peggy Does Her Darndest (1919) - Peggy Ensloe
The Island of Intrigue (1919) - Maida Waring
Castles in the Air (1919) - Fortuna Donnelly
Almost Married (1919) - Adrienne Le Blanc
The Uplifters (1919) - Hortense Troutt
Fair and Warmer (1919) - Blanny Wheeler
The Walk-Offs (1920) - Kathleen Rutherford
The Cheater (1920) - Lilly Meany, aka Vashti Dethic
Held In Trust (1920) - Mary Manchester
Are All Men Alike? (1920) - Teddy Hayden
The Marriage of William Ashe (1921) - Lady Kitty Bristol
Extravagance (1921) - Nancy Vane
The Last Card (1921) - Elsie Kirkwood
Big Game (1921) - Eleanor Winthrop
 The Woman Who Fooled Herself (1922) - Eva Lee
The Broad Road (1923) - Mary Ellen Haley
Flapper Wives (1924) - Claudia Bigelow
Youth for Sale (1924) - Molly Malloy
I Want My Man (1925) - Lael
 Wreckage (1925) - Rene
The Greater Glory (1926) - Corinne
Men of Steel (1926) - Clare Pitt
Mismates (1926) - Belle
The City (1926) - Elinor Voorhees
One Increasing Purpose (1927) - Linda Travers Paris
Her Indiscretion (1927)
The Telephone Girl (1927) - Grace Robinson (final film role)

References

External links

May Allison at Silent Ladies & Gents
May Allison at Virtual History

1890 births
1989 deaths
Actresses from Georgia (U.S. state)
American silent film actresses
Burials in Ohio
Deaths from respiratory failure
People from Dade County, Georgia
20th-century American actresses